Celedonio Lima (born 12 July 1940) is an Argentinian boxer. He competed in the men's light middleweight event at the 1960 Summer Olympics. At the 1960 Summer Olympics, he defeated Jeffrey Alleyne of Canada, before losing to Wilbert McClure of the United States.

References

1940 births
Living people
Argentine male boxers
Olympic boxers of Argentina
Boxers at the 1960 Summer Olympics
Boxers from Buenos Aires
Light-middleweight boxers